Francis Fergusson (1904–1986) was a Harvard and Oxford-educated teacher and critic, a theorist of drama and mythology who wrote The Idea of a Theater, (Princeton, 1949) arguably the best and most influential book about drama written by an American. His readable, illuminating edition of Aristotle's Poetics (Hill and Wang, 1961), with Fergusson's introduction and notes, remains in print. His other works include Dante's Drama of the Mind: A Modern Reading of the Purgatorio, which includes his translations of many passages. In The Rarer Action (Rutgers, 1970), a volume in tribute to Francis Fergusson, the critic Allen Tate wrote: "The Idea of a Theater" is a work comparable in range and depth with Eric Auerbach's "Mimesis". There is no other work by an American critic of which this can be said."

Born in New Mexico, he attended Harvard University, where he befriended future physicist J. Robert Oppenheimer. He then received a Rhodes Scholarship and studied briefly at Oxford University before traveling to France where he befriended Sylvia Beach of Shakespeare and Company. Returning to New York City, he took acting classes with the Polish director Richard Boleslavski and wrote drama criticism for the Herald Tribune. In the early 1930s he founded the drama division of the then new Bennington College in southwestern Vermont. After nearly a decade at Bennington, he moved on to teach at Indiana University and then at Rutgers University, where he taught comparative literature. Among his students were poet Robert Pinsky and fiction writer Alan Cheuse.

Bibliography
 Fergusson, Francis. 1949. The Idea of a Theater: A Study of Ten Plays, The Art of Drama in a Changing Perspective. Princeton, NJ: Princeton UP, 1968. .
Trope and Allegory: Themes Common to Dante and Shakespeare
Dante's Drama of the Mind: A Modern Reading of the Purgatorio
Literary Landmarks: Essays on the Theory and Practice of Literature
Sallies of the Mind
Shakespeare: The Pattern in His Carpet
"Introduction" to Aristotle's Poetics
 Francis Fergusson and Harold Clurman, “On the 'Poetics',” Tulane Drama Review 4.4 (1960): 23–32.

References

Rutgers University faculty
American literary critics
1904 births
1986 deaths
20th-century American non-fiction writers
American Rhodes Scholars
Harvard University alumni
Members of the American Academy of Arts and Letters